Natoltiga Okalah is a Chadian professional football manager.

Career
Since 2006 until 2007 and 2008 he coached the Chad national football team.

References

External links
 
 

Year of birth missing (living people)
Living people
Chadian football managers
Chad national football team managers
Place of birth missing (living people)